Tomáš Marcinko (born 11 April 1988) is a Slovak professional ice hockey forward who plays as a center for HC Oceláři Třinec of the Czech Extraliga (ELH). He was selected by the New York Islanders in the 4th round (115th overall) of the 2006 NHL Entry Draft, but he never played for the team.

On June 26, 2011, the New York Islanders re-signed Marcinko to a one-year, two-way contract.

Since 2019, he has been married to Vladimíra Marcinková, a Member of Slovak parliament. Their daughter Lina was born in 2020.

Career statistics

Regular season and playoffs

International

References

External links
 

1988 births
Living people
Barrie Colts players
Bridgeport Sound Tigers players
HC Dynamo Pardubice players
HC Košice players
HC Oceláři Třinec players
HC Kunlun Red Star players
Modo Hockey players
New York Islanders draft picks
Olympic ice hockey players of Slovakia
Ice hockey players at the 2014 Winter Olympics
Ice hockey players at the 2018 Winter Olympics
Sportspeople from Poprad
Slovak ice hockey centres
Slovak expatriate sportspeople in China
Slovak expatriate ice hockey players in the United States
Slovak expatriate ice hockey players in Canada
Slovak expatriate ice hockey players in the Czech Republic
Slovak expatriate ice hockey players in Sweden
Expatriate ice hockey players in China